Desmond Henry Browne, Baron Browne of Ladyton,  (born 22 March 1952) is a Scottish politician who served in the Cabinet of the United Kingdom under Tony Blair and Gordon Brown as Secretary of State for Defence 2006 to 2008 and Secretary of State for Scotland from 2007 to 2008. A member of the Labour Party, he was Member of Parliament (MP) for Kilmarnock and Loudoun from 1997 to 2010.

Early life and education
Browne was born in Kilwinning, North Ayrshire, lived in Stevenston for the early part of his life, and was educated at the Catholic St Michael's Academy in Kilwinning and later at the University of Glasgow, where he received a degree in law.

Legal career
He started his legal career in 1974 as an apprentice solicitor with the firm James Campbell & Co. On qualifying in 1976 he became an assistant solicitor with Ross, Harper and Murphy, and was promoted to partner in 1980. He became a partner in McCluskey Browne in 1985, and was a council member of the Law Society of Scotland from 1988 to 1992. He was admitted as an advocate in 1993, practising at the Scottish bar until 1997. He worked mainly in child law.

Parliamentary career
Browne contested the parliamentary seat of Argyll and Bute at the 1992 general election, and finished in fourth place behind the sitting Liberal Democrat MP Ray Michie. He was elected to the Faculty of Advocates in 1993. Browne was selected to contest the safe Labour seat of Kilmarnock and Loudoun following the retirement of the sitting MP William McKelvey. Browne won the seat at the 1997 general election with a majority of 7,256. He made his maiden speech on 20 June 1997.

Browne joined the Northern Ireland Affairs Select Committee on his election, and became the Parliamentary Private Secretary (PPS) to the Secretary of State for Scotland Donald Dewar in 1998. After Dewar left the Cabinet in 1999, to seek election as the First Minister of Scotland, Browne remained in post as PPS to the new Secretary of State John Reid. In 2000 he became the PPS to the Minister of State at the Northern Ireland Office.

On 27 November 2009, Browne announced his intention not to seek election in the 2010 general election.

Government minister

After the 2001 general election Browne entered Tony Blair's government as the Parliamentary Under Secretary of State at the Northern Ireland Office. He was promoted to Minister of State for Work in 2003, before moving to the Home Office in 2004 as the minister with responsibility for immigration. He joined the Cabinet following the 2005 general election as the Chief Secretary to the Treasury, and became a member of the Privy Council.

Browne was appointed Secretary of State for Defence on 5 May 2006. An advocate of the UK Trident programme, in 2007 he successfully persuaded Parliament to vote to replace Trident. He came under criticism, however, after allowing the Royal Navy personnel captured by Iran in spring 2007 to sell and publish their stories. Under Blair's premiership, Browne was considered a supporter of the Chancellor of the Exchequer Gordon Brown. He received the additional responsibilities of Secretary of State for Scotland in June 2007 after Brown became Prime Minister.

In a free parliamentary vote on 20 May 2008, Browne voted for cutting the upper limit for abortions from 24 to 12 weeks, along with two other Catholic cabinet ministers, Ruth Kelly and Paul Murphy. He returned to the backbenches in October 2008 following a cabinet reshuffle.

Browne gave evidence to the Iraq Inquiry on 25 January 2010.

He was created a life peer on 22 July 2010, taking the title Baron Browne of Ladyton, of Ladyton in Ayrshire and Arran.

He is a Fellow Commoner of St Catharine's College, Cambridge.

Activities after leaving government
Browne is vice chairman of the Washington, DC-based Nuclear Threat Initiative, a non-profit, nonpartisan organisation founded in 2001 by former U.S. Senator Sam Nunn, who serves as co-chair and CEO, and CNN founder and philanthropist Ted Turner. NTI's mission is to strengthen global security by reducing the risk of use and preventing the spread of nuclear, biological and chemical weapons.

Browne is convener of the European Leadership Network for Multilateral Nuclear Disarmament and Non-proliferation. and he is also convenor of the Top Level Group of UK Parliamentarians for Multilateral Nuclear Disarmament and Non-proliferation, established in October 2009.

He is a signatory of Global Zero, a non-profit international initiative for the elimination of all nuclear weapons worldwide.

Controversy over appointment as envoy to Sri Lanka
In February 2009, Browne was appointed by PM Brown as the government's special envoy to Sri Lanka. However, the government of Mahinda Rajapaksa, fighting the LTTE rebel group, rejected Browne's appointment, stating that the British government made the appointment unilaterally, without consultation with the Sri Lankan government.

References

External links
Des Browne MP website 
 
Ministry of Defence official biography
Speech on Iraq November 2006
Speech on Afghanistan September 2006
Speech on the UK's Nuclear Deterrent January 2007
Guardian Unlimited Politics - Ask Aristotle: Des Browne MP
TheyWorkForYou.com - Des Browne MP
Des Browne's article in the Daily Record, covering President Obama's Inauguration 20 January 2009
Global Zero
Des Browne at Global Zero

1952 births
Living people
People from Kilwinning
Alumni of the University of Glasgow
Fellows of St Catharine's College, Cambridge
Members of the Faculty of Advocates
Scottish Roman Catholics
Scottish Labour MPs
Members of the Privy Council of the United Kingdom
Northern Ireland Office junior ministers
Secretaries of State for Defence (UK)
UK MPs 1997–2001
UK MPs 2001–2005
UK MPs 2005–2010
20th-century Scottish politicians
21st-century Scottish politicians
20th-century Roman Catholics
21st-century Roman Catholics
Life peers created by Elizabeth II
People educated at St Michaels Academy
Scottish lawyers
Chief Secretaries to the Treasury